The ash tip borer (Papaipema furcata) is a species of moth of the family Noctuidae. It is found from Quebec and New Hampshire to Georgia, west to Louisiana and north to Manitoba.

The wingspan is about 33–49 mm. The forewings are pale yellow with brown lines and shading. The hindwings are pale yellow without shading. Adults are on wing from August to October.

The larvae feed on Fraxinus species and Acer negundo. They bore into the twigs of their host plant.

References

Moths described in 1899
Moths of North America
Papaipema